Joe Whitt Jr. (born 1978) is an American football coach who is currently the secondary coach for the Dallas Cowboys of the National Football League (NFL). He previously was the defensive pass game coordinator and cornerbacks coach of the Green Bay Packers and secondary coach/pass game coordinator for the Cleveland Browns and for the Atlanta Falcons.

Coaching career
Whitt attended Auburn High School, graduating in 1997, and was a walk-on wide receiver for the Auburn Tigers football team the following season before earning a scholarship.  When an injury ended his playing career, Whitt became a student assistant at Auburn University.  After completing a degree in communications in 2001, Whitt was hired as wide receivers coach at The Citadel before moving on to become cornerbacks coach and recruiting coordinator at the University of Louisville under head coach Bobby Petrino in 2003.  In 2006, Whitt moved with Petrino to the Falcons.

Whitt Jr. spent time with the Atlanta Falcons in 2007 as an Assistant Defensive Backs coach.

Green Bay Packers
After the majority of the defensive coaching staff was fired after a disappointing 2008 season, he was one of only two defensive coaches retained by the Packers. It was then officially announced by the Packers that he was promoted from defensive quality control to cornerbacks coach on February 3, 2009. In the 2009 season, the Packers went 11-5 and made the NFC Wild Card. They would go on to lose to the Arizona Cardinals 45-51 in overtime. Under his coaching, Charles Woodson made the Pro Bowl, named 1st-team All-Pro, and was named the 2009 NFL Defensive Player of the Year as well as 2-time NFC Defensive Player of the Week and 3-time NFC Defensive Player of the Month.

In the 2010 off-season, the Packers signed cornerback Sam Shields as an undrafted free agent. The Packers would go 10-6 and make the NFC Wild Card again in 2010, making the playoffs for the second year in a row. They would go on to beat Michael Vick's Philadelphia Eagles, Matt Ryan's Atlanta Falcons, division rival Chicago Bears, and make the Super Bowl. They would beat the Pittsburgh Steelers 31-25 to win the franchise's fourth Lombardi Trophy and the second time in NFL history a sixth seed won it all. Under his coaching, Charles Woodson made the Pro Bowl and was named 2nd-team All-Pro. Cornerback Tramon Williams was later added as a reserve to the Pro Bowl.

In the 2011 off-season, the Packers selected cornerback Davon House in the fourth round (131st overall) of the 2011 NFL Draft. The Packers went a franchise-best  15-1 in 2011, the fifth team in NFL history to due so, the last time was the 2004 Pittsburgh Steelers, winning the NFC North for the first time since 2007 and making the playoffs for the third year in a row. They would lose in the opening round 20-37 to the New York Giants. Under his coaching, Charles Woodson was named a Pro Bowler & 1st-team All-Pro.

In the 2012 off-season, the Packers selected cornerback Casey Hayward in the second round (62nd overall) of the 2012 NFL Draft. The Packers would go 11-5 in 2012 and win the NFC North in back-to-back years for the first time since 2002-03. They would lose to the San Francisco 49ers 31-45 in the Divisional Round.

During the 2013 season, the Packers went 8-7-1 and won the NFC North for the third straight year for the first time since 2002-04. They would lose to the San Francisco 49ers in the opening round.

During the 2014 season, the Packers went 12-4 and won the NFC North for the fourth straight year for the first time in franchise history. They made the playoffs for the sixth year in a row, tying a franchise record set between 1993-98. They would lose to the Seattle Seahawks in the NFC Championship Game. Under his coaching, Sam Shields made the Pro Bowl.

In the 2015 off-season the Packers would let corners Davon House and Tramon Williams leave in free agency, so they drafted corners Damarious Randall (1st round, 30th pick) and Quinten Rollins (2nd round, 62nd pick) in the 2015 NFL Draft. They would go 10-6 in 2015 and make the NFC Wild Card, clinching the playoffs for a franchise record seven straight times. They would lose to the Arizona Cardinals in the Divisional Round.

In 2016, the Packers went 10-6 and won the franchise's 9th NFC North title, making their 32nd playoff appearance. They would lose to the Atlanta Falcons in the NFC Championship game.

In 2017, the Packers went 7-9, the first time out of the playoffs and a losing season since 2008.

After spending 2018 as the Packers defensive passing game coordinator, they would miss the playoffs and head coach Mike McCarthy was fired. He would be dismissed on January 11, 2019.

Cleveland Browns
On January 16, 2019, Whitt was hired by the Cleveland Browns. Serving as secondary coach and pass game coordinator, Whitt helped the Browns finish seventh in the league in pass defense.

Atlanta Falcons
On January 9, 2020, the Atlanta Falcons hired Whitt as secondary coach.

Dallas Cowboys
On January 13, 2021, the Dallas Cowboys hired Whitt as secondary coach and passing game coordinator, reuniting him with head coach Mike McCarthy and defensive coordinator Dan Quinn.

Personal life
Joe Whitt Jr. is the son of Joe Whitt Sr., a linebackers coach at Auburn University.

References

Green Bay Packers coaches
Auburn High School (Alabama) alumni
Auburn Tigers football players
Auburn Tigers football coaches
The Citadel Bulldogs football coaches
Louisville Cardinals football coaches
Players of American football from Alabama
Living people
Atlanta Falcons coaches
Cleveland Browns coaches
American football wide receivers
Sportspeople from Auburn, Alabama
1978 births
Dallas Cowboys coaches